Belarusian Germans formed a notable ethnic minority on the lands of modern Belarus before World War I.

History
The first German merchants and missionaries, including Bruno of Querfurt, arrived in what is now Belarus in the late 10th and early 11th century. The medieval Duchy of Polotsk had active trade contacts with the Hanseatic League and the city of Polotsk had a notable German community.

Significant numbers of Germans settled in what is now Belarus during the times of the Grand Duchy of Lithuania, the Polish–Lithuanian Commonwealth and after the annexation of the lands by the Russian Empire.

In early 20th century there were close to 50,000 ethnic Germans living in Belarus. Minsk was home to a 2,000-member community of Germans with a Lutheran church and a German-populated area around it.

Germans faced deportations after the beginning of the First World War and during the Soviet repressions in Belarus. After World War II, the historical German communities in Belarus disappeared. A minor number of ethnic Germans from Kazakhstan and Russia migrated to Belarus during the Soviet occupation after the Second World War. A small German expat community emerged after Belarus regained independence in 1991.

According to a census conducted in 2009, 2,474 ethnic Germans lived in Belarus. There are Lutheran church buildings in Grodno and Polotsk. A sign commemorating the German community of Minsk was opened in May 2019.

Notable Belarusian Germans
 Otto Schmidt, Soviet scientist and statesman 
 Barys Hiunter, member of the Supreme Soviet of Belarus from the Belarusian Popular Front, of Volga German origin
 Juliana Menke, activist of the Belarusian national revival movement, from a Lithuanian German family
 Eduard von der Ropp, Roman Catholic archbishop of Mogilev from 1917 to 1939, one of the advocates of the introduction of the Belarusian language in the Catholic Church in Belarus
 Lavon Volski, rock musician of German descent

See also 
 Belarus–Germany relations

Notes

References

Ethnic groups in Belarus
Belarus–Germany relations
 
Belarus